The Waves Vienna – Music Festival & Conference is a yearly international showcase festival for pop music in Vienna, Austria. The lineup is mainly focused on alternative and indie music. The festival takes place in a series of music venues in Vienna, such as the Fluc, Flex, and Odeon.

Waves Vienna 2011 

Artists: Agent Cooper (AT), Allen Alexis (AT), Andrew Hung (GB), Andrew Weatherall (GB, abgesagt), Brasstronaut (CA), Bilderbuch (AT), Black Shampoo (AT), British Sea Power (GB), Cherry Sunkist (AT), Clara Luzia (AT), D.I.M. (DE), Destroy, Munich (AT), Die Eternias (AT), Dikta (IS), DJ Phono (DE), Emily Barker (US), Ewert and the Two Dragons (EE), Figurines (DK), Film (GR), Haight-Ashbury (GB), Ian Fisher (US), Instrumenti (LV), Is Tropical (GB), Jacek Sienkiewicz (PL), Jamie Woon (GB), Jana Vébrová (CZ), Jellybeat (AT), Ken Hayakawa (AT), Kenton Slash Demon (DK), Killed by 9V Batteries (AT), Kreatiivmootor (EE), Kyst (PL), Little Scream (CA), Longital (SK), M185 (AT), Ogris Debris (AT), Peterlicker (AT), Petrol (RS), Photek (GB), Plastic Swans (SK), Resorts (CA), Retro Stefson (IS), Rubik (FI), SAEDI (AT), School is Cool (BE), Sheila She Loves You (CH), Sin Fang (IS), Slap In The Bass (HU), Svavar Knútur (IS), Sweet Sweet Moon (AT), Tempelhof (CZ), The Beth Edges (AT), The Duke Spirit (GB), The Uniques (SK), Totally Enormous Extinct Dinosaurs (GB, abgesagt), Touchy Mob (DE), When Saints Go Machine (DK), WhoMadeWho (DK), Wolfram (AT), Woody Alien (PL), Zola Jesus (US)

Waves Vienna 2012 

Artists: 1984 (F), Absynthe Minded (BE), Addison Groove (UK), Anna Aaron (CH), Aeromaschine (RO), Agent Side Grinder (S), And the Golden Choir (DE), The Bianca Story (CH), Birgit Bidder (S), Bloom (band) (SK), Botibol (F), Bottled In England (DK), Didi Bruckmayr & Mussurunga (AT), Bunny Lake (AT), Sera Cahoone (US), Charlie Straight (band) (CZ), Colt Silvers (F), Concrete Knives (F), Dena (BG), Dillon (BR/DE), Dorn (AT), Dust Covered Carpet (AT), DZA (RU), Electric Suicide Club (F), Eloui (AT), Esteban's (AT), Fenster (DE), B. Fleischmann (AT), Friedrich & Ludwig (AT), Frostfelt (FO), Ghostpoet (UK), Gold Panda (UK), Got Blue Balls (SK), Gravenhurst (UK), Hal Flavin (UK), Honig (DE), HVOB (AT), Inborn (LU), Juveniles (F), Kamp! (PL), Kavinsky (F), Kidcat Lo-fi (AT), Björn Kleinheinz (S), Konea Ra-Phekt-Luma.Launisch (AT), Luise Pop (AT), Mario & Vidis (LT),  Me and My Drummer (DE), Mieux (F), mile me deaf (AT), Milk+ (AT), Miloopa (PL), MKID (AT), Mopedrock!! (AT), La Mort De Darius (F), Mujuice (RU), Murmansk (FI), Neodisco (AT), Nive Nielsen & The Deer Children (DK), Nova Heart (CN), Novika and Lex (PL), Orka + Budam (FO), Őszibarack (PL), Pantha du Prince (DE), Violetta Parisini (AT), Paula i Karol (PL), The Pharmacy (US), Plus Guest (F), Poétique Électronique (DE), Mike Polinary (PL), Professor Leopard (CZ), Rangleklods (DK), Rats on Rafts (NL), The Raw Men Empire (IL), Rocketnumbernine (UK), Lucy Rose (UK), Rue Royale (UK), Rustie (UK), Sakaris (FO), Sea & Air (DE), Sex Jams (AT), SLG (PL), The Soundtrack of Our Lives (S), Stereoface (AT), Stranded Horse (F), Einar Stray (NO), The Suicide of Western Culture (ES), Sun Glitters (LU), Swearing At Motorists (US), Talking to Turtles (DE), Team Me (NO), Thomalla (DE) & Martin Riegelnegg (AT), A Thousand Fuegos (AT), Too Tangled (BE), Toy (UK), Tu Fawning (US), Twilite (PL), UMA (DE), Vierkanttretlager (DE), Vinnie Who (DK), The Wave Pictures (UK), The Wedding Present (UK), Wolfram (AT), Wrongkong (DE/CND) und Zebra Dots (HR)

Waves Vienna 2013 

The third Waves Festival took place from October 3 to 6. This years guest countries were Slovenia and Belgium. 2013 marked the first year for Waves Bratislava which was held parallel to Waves Vienna.

Waves Vienna 
Acts

Artur8 (PL), Ash My Love (AT), CSS (BR), Electric Soft Parade (UK), Farewell Dear Ghost (AT), Go! Go! Gorillo (AT), Hurricane Dean (DE), Frida Hyvönen (SE), Julian & der Fux (AT), Kreisky (AT), Yuri Landman Ensemble (NL), Lovely Quinces (HR), Touristen Tempo (AT), Wandl (AT), A.G.Trio (at), Amatorski (be), Kari Amirian (PL), Anika (de), Au Revoir Simone (us), The Beth Edges (at), Marla Blumenblatt (de), BRNS (be), Charli XCX (uk), Cid Rim (at), The Clonious (at), Cold Mailman (no), Compuphonic (be), Crunch 22 (il), Dans Dans (be), Deadnote Danse (at), Lenka Dusilova (cz), The End Band (at), Ernesty International (at), Exclusive (de), Fijuka (at), Filou (at), Float Fall (be), Flying Horseman (be), Fuckhead (at), The GFs (cz), Ghost Capsules (at), Girls In Hawaii (be), Ian Green (si), Grimus (ro), Hella Comet (at), I-Wolf & The Chainreactions (at), Illute (de), It's Everyone Else (si), Japanther (us), Alise Joste (lv), Kabul Dreams (af), Kate Boy (se), Kieslowski (cz), Kill Kenny (si), Kingsfoil (us), Kristoffer & The Harbourheads (se), Krystal Klear (uk), Leure (au), Milk Drinkers (si), Mmoths (i.e.), Mozes & The Firstborn (nl), Múm (is), My Heart Belongs To Cecilia Winter (ch), Napravi Mi Dete (si), New Wave Syria (si), Nowhere Train (at), Oscar and the Wolf (be), The Ringo Jets (tr), Say Yes Dog (lu), Sex On The Beach (at), Skream (uk), Slut (de), Sohn (uk), Soldout (be), Trains Of Thoughts (at), The Touch (se), The Toronto Drug Bust (si), Velvet Two Stripes (ch), Mika Vember (at), Vortex Rex (at), Werefox (si)

Waves Vienna 2016 
The 6th edition of Waves Vienna took place from September 29 to October 1. For the first time the festival was held in and around the cultural center WUK. The motto of this years Waves Conference was "Collaborate. Communicate. Connect." and featured panel guests such as  Scott Cohen (The Orchard), Conchita Wurst, Andras Berta (Sziget), Electric Indigo, Robert Glashüttner (FM4), Ineke Daans (PIAS), Lukas Hasitschka (Wanda), Marie Heimer (Spotify), Peter Hörburger (Spielboden) and Trishes amongst others.

Acts

A Life, A Song, A Cigarette (AT), Affe Maria (DE), Alex The Flipper (AT), Anne-Marie (UK), Anthony Mills und Clefco (SE/AT), Autonomics (US), Avec (AT), B.Visible (AT), Black Honey (UK), Black Lotus Experiment (AT), Blockflöte des Todes (DE), Buenoventura (AT), Cid Rim (AT), DJ Invincible (CH), DJ Moe (AT), DJ Ruff (NL), Eloui (CH/AT), Elsa Tootsie and the Mini Band (AT), Ephemerals (UK), Finley Quaye (UK), FLUT (AT), GelbGut (AT), Gemma Ray (UK), Girls Names (UK), Giuseppe Leonardi (AT), Glass Museum (BE), Golf (DE), Hannah Epperson (CA), Hans (AT), Haze'evot (IL), Hella Comet (AT), Holy Fuck (CA), HΔNNΔ (AT), Indigorado (NO/SE), Jardier (SI), Jarus & Jumbie (AT), Jay Cooper (AT/UK), Jimi Tenor (FI), Jonathan Bestley (UK), Juicy Gay (DE), Kafka Tamura (DE/UK), Karmakoma (SI), Kevin Etheridge (AT), Klaus Johann Grobe (CH), Klischée (CH), Kriget (SE), Langtunes (IR), Lausch (AT), Leitstrahl (DJ) (AT), LFNT (IL), Lola Marsh (IL), M.P. (AT), Matt Boroff (AT/DE/US), Matt Gresham (AU), Mavi Phoenix (AT), Milk+ (AT), Molly (Band) (AT), Molto Loud (KZ), Monophobe (AT), Monsterheart (AT), Mosch (AT), Mule & Man (CH), NOËP (EE), Norma Jean Martine (US), Oligarkh (RU), Ori (IL/DE), Parasol Caravan (AT), Pola Rise (PL), Powernerd (AT), Resisters (AT), Ritornell und Mimu (AT), Rival Kings (CH), Robb (AT/US), Sarah Ferri (BE), Satellites (US), Seraphim (AT), Smerz (DK), Soulitaire (AT), Stabil Elite (DE), Superpoze (FR), Svper (ES), The Canyon Observer (SI), The Crispies (AT), The Ills (SK), The Souls (CH), Totemo (IL), Vimes (DE), WÆLDER (AT/DE), Warhaus (BE), We Are Scientists (US)

References 

Waves Vienna
Waves Vienna at FM4

External links

Music festivals in Austria
Music festivals established in 2011
Pop music festivals
Festivals in Vienna